Cecilia is a personal name originating in the name of Saint Cecilia, the patron saint of music.

History 
The name has been popularly used in Europe (particularly the United Kingdom and Italy, where in 2018 it was the 43rd most popular name for girls born that year), and the United States, where it has ranked among the top 500 names for girls for more than 100 years. It also ranked among the top 100 names for girls born in Sweden in the early years of the 21st century, and was formerly popular in France.

The name "Cecilia" applied generally to Roman women who belonged to the plebeian clan of the Caecilii. Legends and hagiographies, mistaking it for a personal name, suggest fanciful etymologies. Among those cited by Chaucer in "The Second Nun's Tale" are: lily of heaven, the way for the blind, contemplation of heaven and the active life, as if lacking in blindness, and a heaven for people to gaze upon.

People 
 Saint Cecilia, 2nd century virgin martyr and patron Saint of musicians and Church music
 Princess Cecilia of Sweden (1540–1627)
 Princess Cecilia of Sweden (1807–1844)
 Cecilia of Normandy (died 1126), thought to be the daughter of William the Conqueror
 Cecilia (Norwegian singer) (born 1967)
 Cecilia (royal mistress) (d. after 1459), royal mistress and later morganatic wife of Eric of Pomerania, king of Denmark, Norway and Sweden
 Cecilia (Spanish singer) (1948–1976) 
 Cecilia Angmadlok Angutialuk (born 1938), Canadian Inuk artist 
 Cécilia Attias (born 1957), former First Lady of France, ex-wife of President Nicolas Sarkozy
 Cecilia Bartoli (born 1966), Italian mezzo-soprano
 Cecilia Beaux (1855–1942), American society portrait painter
 Cecilia Bolocco (born 1965), Chilean television entertainer, former Miss Universe 1987 and former wife of ex-Argentine president Carlos Menem
 Cecilia Bowes-Lyon (1862–1938), British aristocrat and grandmother of Queen Elizabeth II
 Cecilia LW Chan, Chinese social scientist
 Cecilia Cheung (born 1980), Hong Kong singer and actress
 Cecilia Colledge (1920–2008), British figure skater
 Cecilia Curbelo (born 1975), Uruguayan writer
 Cecilia Dalman Eek (born 1960), Swedish politician
 Cecilia Damström, Finnish composer
 Cecilia Danieli (1943–1999), Italian entrepreneur and industrialist 
 Cecilia D'Elia (born 1963), Italian politician 
 Cecilia Gallerani (1473–1536), favourite and most celebrated mistress of Ludovico Sforza, Duke of Milan
 Cecilia Gasdia (born 1960), Italian soprano
 Cecilia Gillie (1907–1996), English radio executive
 Cecilia Grierson (1859–1934), Argentine physician and activist 
 Cecilia Johansdotter of Sweden (fl. 1193), Queen Consort of King Canute I of Sweden
 Cecilia Keaveney (born 1968), Irish politician
 Cecilia Malmström (born 1968), Swedish politician
 Cecilia Mangini (1927–2021), Italian film director
 Cecilia Suyat Marshall (1928–2022), American civil rights activist and historian
 Cecilia Moens, Canadian developmental biologist
 Cecilia Morel (born 1954), Chilean First Lady, wife of President Sebastián Piñera
 Cecilia Muñoz (born 1962), Director of Intergovernmental Affairs at the White House
 Cecilia Noël (born c. 1960s), wife and co-performer of Men at Work singer Colin Hay
 Cecilia Nilsson (athlete) (born 1979), Swedish hammer thrower
 Cecilia Pantoja (born 1943), better known as Cecilia, Chilean singer songwriter
 Cecilia Parker (1914–1993), Canadian actress
 Cecilia Payne-Gaposchkin (1900–1979), English-American astronomer
 Cecilia Requena (born 1967), Bolivian politician
 Cecilia Rich, American politician
 Cecilia Suárez (born 1971), Mexican actress
 Cecilia Tan (born 1967), American writer
 Cecilia Young (1712–1789), English soprano

See also

Cecelia, a surname
Celia (given name)
Cissy (disambiguation)
Orpheus

References 

Italian feminine given names
English feminine given names
Latin feminine given names